The Trombone Sound is an album by American jazz trombonist Kai Winding featuring performances recorded in 1956 for the Columbia label.

Reception

The Allmusic awarded the album 3 stars.

Track listing
 "Whistle While You Work" (Frank Churchill, Larry Morey) - 2:41
 "My Little Girl" (Richard Rodgers) - 2:45
 "Blue Room" (Rogers, Lorenz Hart) - 2:23
 "Nutcracker" (Wayne Andre, Victor Feldman) - 2:49
 "Breezin' Along with the Breeze" (Haven Gillespie, Richard A. Whiting, Seymour Simons) - 2:22
 "Jim and Andy's" (Lou Stein) - 2:58
 "Old School Ties" (Bob Brookmeyer) - 2:45
 "Captain Kut-Cha" (Nat Pierce) - 3:14
 "Every Girl Is My Valentine" (Tom Talbert) - 2:54
 "Under a Blanket of Blues" (Al Cohn) - 4:08
 "Sunday" (Chester Conn, Benny Krueger, Jule Styne, Ned Miller) - 3:18
 "Nice Work If You Can Get It" (George Gershwin, Ira Gershwin) - 3:11
 "I Want to Be Happy" (Vincent Youmans, Irving Caesar) = 2:58

Personnel
Kai Winding – trombone, arranger
Wayne Andre, Carl Fontana – trombone
Dick Leib - bass trombone
Roy Frazee – piano, celeste
Kenny O'Brien – bass
Jack Franklin – drums

References

Columbia Records albums
Kai Winding albums
1956 albums